Henwick railway station was a station in Henwick, Worcestershire, England. The station was opened on 25 July 1859 and closed on 3 April 1965.

References

Further reading

Disused railway stations in Worcestershire
Railway stations in Great Britain opened in 1859
Railway stations in Great Britain closed in 1965
Former Great Western Railway stations
Beeching closures in England